Ndo, also Ke’bu, Kebu, or Membitu, is a Central Sudanic language of northeastern Congo and western Uganda spoken by a caste of blacksmiths.

References

Central Sudanic languages